Seeblick is a municipality in the Havelland district, in Brandenburg, Germany.

Demography

References

Localities in Havelland